Wolfgang Schmieder (May 29, 1901 – November 8, 1990) was a German music librarian and musicologist.

Schmieder was born in Bromberg (now Bydgoszcz, Poland). In 1950, he published the BWV, or Bach-Werke-Verzeichnis ("Bach Works Catalogue"), a catalog of musical works by Johann Sebastian Bach. The numbering system used in the BWV has since become a nearly universal standard, used by scholars and musicians around the world.  (BWV numbers are sometimes referred to as "Schmieder" numbers; the designations S 971 and BWV 971 therefore refer to the same thing, the Italian Concerto.) Schmieder served as the Special Advisor for Music for the City and University Library at Johann Wolfgang Goethe University of Frankfurt am Main from April 1942 until his retirement in 1963. He lived in Freiburg im Breisgau until his death in November 1990 at the age of 89.

References

1901 births
1990 deaths
Bach scholars
20th-century German composers
20th-century German musicologists
20th-century conductors (music)
Music librarians
People from Bydgoszcz